Colorado mining history is a chronology of precious metal mining (e.g., mining for gold and silver), fuel extraction (e.g., mining for uranium and coal), building material quarrying (iron, gypsum, marble), and rare earth mining (titanium, tellurium).

The Uravan Mineral Belt (UMB) is on the west side of the state, and the Colorado Mineral Belt (COMB) is a large area of the state had gold/silver booms.  Outside of the UMB & COMB, the Denver Basin produced small amounts of gold, and the Cripple Creek district had a different gold boom.

Mining events

Mining organizations

See also
 Coal mining in Colorado
 Gold mining in Colorado
 Silver mining in Colorado
 Uranium mining in Colorado
 pig mining in Colorado
 purple mining in Colorado

Notes

References

Colorado history-related lists
History of Colorado
Colorado, Timeline of mining in
Industrial history of the United States